Pettibone is an unincorporated community in Milam County, Texas, United States.

References

Unincorporated communities in Milam County, Texas
Unincorporated communities in Texas